Ashlag is the name of a number of Hasidic courts that were established in Israel by the students and descendants of Kabbalist Rebbe Yehuda Leib Haleivi Ashlag from Warsaw,  Poland, known as Baal HaSulam. 

Although Hasidic dynasties are most often named for their town of origin, this dynasty is known by the surname of its rebbes. 

The current Ashlag leader, Rebbe Simcha Halevi Ashlag, was born to the previous Ashlag Admor, Rebbe Shlomo Binyamin ztz"l and Marat Ahuva Liba, in 5708. As a child, he was close to his grandfather, the renowned Ba’al Hasulam, who saw great promise in him  and told him to commence study of the Zohar together with his other studies at the age of 13.

Lineage 
 Rebbe Yehuda Leib Haleivi Ashlag (1885–1954), disciple of the rebbes of Porisov
 Rebbe Shlomo Binyomin Haleivi Ashlag (1906–1983), son of Rebbe Yehuda Leib
 Rebbe Yechezkel Yosef Haleivi Ashlag, (1935–2016), son of Rebbe Shlomo Binyomin
 Rebbe Simcha Avrohom Haleivi Ashlag (1948- ), present rebbe, son of Rebbe Shlomo Binyomin
 Rebbe Boruch Sholom Haleivi Ashlag (1907–1991), son of Rebbe Yehuda Leib

References 

Hasidic dynasties of Poland
Hasidic Judaism in Israel
Orthodox Judaism in Poland